The World Allround Speed Skating Championships for Men took place on 14 and 15 February 1970 in Oslo at the Bislett Stadium ice rink.

Title holder was the Norwegian Dag Fornæss.

Result

 * = Fell

Source:

References 

World Allround Speed Skating Championships, 1970
1970 World Allround